Starrcade '86: Night of the Skywalkers was the fourth annual Starrcade professional wrestling closed-circuit television event, produced by Jim Crockett Promotions (JCP) under the National Wrestling Alliance (NWA) banner. It took place on November 27, 1986, from the Greensboro Coliseum Complex in Greensboro, North Carolina and Omni Coliseum in Atlanta, Georgia.

The main event saw NWA World Heavyweight Champion Ric Flair put the championship on the line against the NWA United States Champion Nikita Koloff in a rare for the time champion-vs-champion match. The dual location saw six matches take place in each location, with the Greensboro Coliseum main event being a steel cage match between defending NWA World Tag Team Champion The Rock 'n' Roll Express (Ricky Morton and Robert Gibson) defended the championship against the Andersons (Arn and Ole). The "Skywalkers" tag line came from one of the featured matches of the show where The Road Warriors wrestled The Midnight Express in a scaffold match with both team fighting atop a 20 foot tall scaffold erected across the top of the ring.

Highlights of the show was shown on JCP's weekly television shows and an edited version of the show was later available for purchase or rental on VHS tape. With the launch of the WWE Network in 2014 all closed-circuit Starrcades (1983 through 1986) alongside the subsequent Starrcade shows appear in the pay-per-view section. The WWE Network versions of the shows were not edited for content, but some entrance music was replaced due to copyright issues. At 4 hours, this Starrcade is the longest in the event's history.

Production

Background
From the 1960s to the 1980s, it was tradition for the NWA member JCP to hold major professional wrestling events at Thanksgiving and Christmas, often at the Greensboro Coliseum in Greensboro, North Carolina in the center of JCP's Virginia, North and South Carolina territory. In 1983, JCP created Starrcade as their supercard to continue the Thanksgiving tradition, bringing in wrestlers from other NWA affiliates and broadcasting the show throughout its territory on closed-circuit television. Starrcade soon became the flagship event of the year for JCP (later World Championship Wrestling, WCW), their Super Bowl event featuring their most important storyline feuds and championship matches. The 1986 event was the fourth show to use the Starrcade name, and the last event to take place in two different locations at once.

Storylines
The Starrcade show featured a number of professional wrestling matches with different wrestlers involved in pre-existing, scripted feuds, plots, and storylines. Wrestlers were portrayed as either heels (those that portray the "bad guys") or faces (the "good guy" characters) as they followed a series of tension-building events, which culminated in a wrestling match or series of matches.

Magnum T. A. was originally scheduled to face Ric Flair at the 1986 Starrcade, but was left temporarily paralyzed and had to end his wrestling career as a result of a car accident. The NWA decided to have Nikita Koloff, who was engaged in a feud with Ronnie Garvin at the time, turn face as a result and took Magnum T. A.'s place in the main event of the show.

Event

The 1986 Starrcade show took place in two separate locations, the Greensboro Coliseum and The Omni in Atlanta, Georgia. The shows were broadcast live on closed-circuit TV to the other arena. The show alternated between matches, starting with Tim Horner and Nelson Royal defeated Rocky and Don Kernodle in a Tag team match at the Greensboro Coliseum, then switching over to the first match at the Omni, alternating until Ric Flair and Nikita Koloff faced off in the main event at the Omni. Switching between shows allowed the Atlanta crowd to watch The Road Warriors wrestle The Midnight Express while the steel cage was set up for the Greensboro Coliseum main event match between The Rock 'n' Roll Express and the Anderson Brothers (Arn and Ole Anderson).

The Road Warriors won the "Skywalkers" scaffold match by knocking both Bobby Eaton and Dennis Condrey off of the scaffold, dropping into the ring below. After the match manager Paul Ellering chased Jim Cornette up the scaffold; this led to Cornette suffering a legitimate severe knee injury when he fell from the underside of the scaffold onto Big Bubba Rogers. Rogers was supposed to catch Cornette, but failed to do so. Cornette did not land properly and had to be carried out of the ring. Road Warrior Hawk wrestled the match with a broken leg, an injury he suffered during a match during a Japanese tour The Road Warriors did a month earlier.

Aftermath
Jimmy Valiant's years-long feud with Paul Jones finally came to an end, Jones would go on to manage Rick Rude and Manny Fernandez to the NWA World Tag Team titles, then lost them back to the Rock 'n' Roll Express after Rude jumped to the WWF in 1987.  Ole Anderson would be kicked out of the Four Horsemen in February, 1987, replaced by Lex Luger, with his performance in this match as well as being absent for his son Bryant's amateur wrestling matches (in reality, this is the reason Anderson wanted to retire from active competition) being the pretext of kicking him out.  Arn, having thus split from Ole, would form a tag team in the Horsemen with Blanchard, winning two NWA World Tag Team titles as Horsemen and one WWF World tag team championship as The Brain Busters.  Also forming a regular tag team were the newly babyface Nikita Koloff and his former enemy Dusty Rhodes - the Superpowers would go on to win the 1987 Crockett Cup.

Big Bubba Rogers would move to the UWF after Jim Crockett Promotions bought the territory in April 1987, and winning their world title then briefly returning to JCP and his bodyguard role for Cornette before jumping to the WWF to become the Big Boss Man.  Jimmy Garvin would turn face in 1987 after his (kayfabe) brother Ron Garvin had his face burned at the hands of Jim Cornette and the Midnight Express, then would challenge Ric Flair for the NWA World Heavyweight Title during that summer's Great American Bash.  Sam Houston, in real life, married Baby Doll and would eventually leave Central States for the WWF. Also headed to the WWF shortly after this event was Kruscher Kruschev (Barry Darsow) who would replace Randy Colley in the role of Smash of Demolition in late January 1987 - the resulting "classic" Demolition lineup of Darsow and Bill Eadie as Ax would go on to win three WWF World Tag Team championships, the first of these being the longest reign ever with the belts. Kruschev's spot in the Russian Team, meanwhile would be taken by Vladimir Petrov who, along with Ivan Koloff, continued to feud with Nikita.

Results

References

1986 in professional wrestling
Starrcade
1986 in Georgia (U.S. state)
1986 in North Carolina
Events in Atlanta
Events in Greensboro, North Carolina
Professional wrestling in Atlanta
Professional wrestling in Greensboro, North Carolina
November 1986 events in the United States